In the 1863 Costa Rican general election Jesús Jiménez Zamora was elected president of Costa Rica for the first time, succeeding José María Montealegre Fernández. He would dissolve the Congress almost immediately afterwards and call for new parliamentary elections restoring calm and ending his period peacefully.

References

Elections in Costa Rica
1863 elections in Central America
Single-candidate elections
1863 in Costa Rica